The Kia Sportage, in the Chinese market, is a compact crossover SUV produced by Dongfeng Yueda Kia. The first two generations of the Kia Sportage in China are the same as the international version, while the international third generation was sold in China as the Kia Sportage R and the international fourth generation as the Kia KX5. The China-exclusive third generation Kia Sportage was developed as a separate model based on the second generation Hyundai Tucson (sold as the ix35 in China).



First generation (JE; 2005) 

The first generation Chinese market Kia Sportage was the same as the international version (JE/KM) sold from 2005–2010. Production was extended after the discontinuation of the international model, with an extra facelift in 2013 exclusive to China, extending production and sales to 2015.

Second generation (SL; 2010) 

The second generation Kia Sportage in China was sold as the Kia Sportage R. The Kia Sportage R received a facelift in 2013, and was sold alongside its successor, the Kia KX5 for a brief period.

Third generation (NP; 2018) 

The third-generation Chinese Sportage was revealed at the 2017 Shanghai Auto Show in China. It was previewed by the Kia NP Concept revealed during the 2017 Guangzhou Auto Show. The production version was available to China in early 2018.

The Kia Sportage III is based on the Hyundai ix35 which shares the same platform with the Chinese second generation Hyundai ix35. The Kia Sportage III is powered by a 2.0-litre inline-4 engine producing .

Kia Sportage Ace (2021 facelift)
A facelift called the Kia Sportage Ace was launched during the 2020 Guangzhou Auto Show. The Sportage Ace features completely redesigned front and rear ends adding  to the vehicle length with the updated headlamps integrated into the silhouette of the grilles and the tail lamps being vertical compared to the horizontal ones extending into the tailgate of the pre-facelift model. The Sportage Ace also features a 1.5-litre turbo engine producing .

References

External links 

Sportage (China)
All-wheel-drive vehicles
Cars introduced in 2017
Crossover sport utility vehicles
Compact sport utility vehicles
Front-wheel-drive vehicles
Cars of China